Valencia is a census-designated place (CDP) in Valencia County, New Mexico, United States. The population was 2,192 at the 2010 census. It is part of the Albuquerque Metropolitan Statistical Area.

Geography
Valencia is located at  (34.795206, -106.692575).

Demographics

As of the census of 2000, there were 4,500 people, 1,553 households, and 1,248 families residing in the CDP. The population density was 819.4 people per square mile (316.5/km). There were 1,646 housing units at an average density of 299.7 per square mile (115.8/km). The racial makeup of the CDP was 68.87% White, 0.76% African American, 1.93% Native American, 0.67% Asian, 0.09% Pacific Islander, 23.07% from other races, and 4.62% from two or more races. Hispanic or Latino of any race were 49.67% of the population.

There were 1,553 households, out of which 37.1% had children under the age of 18 living with them, 63.0% were married couples living together, 11.4% had a female householder with no husband present, and 19.6% were non-families. 15.4% of all households were made up of individuals, and 4.2% had someone living alone who was 65 years of age or older. The average household size was 2.87 and the average family size was 3.17.

In the CDP, the population was spread out, with 27.9% under the age of 18, 8.0% from 18 to 24, 28.5% from 25 to 44, 25.5% from 45 to 64, and 10.1% who were 65 years of age or older. The median age was 37 years. For every 100 females, there were 98.3 males. For every 100 females age 18 and over, there were 95.0 males.

The median income for a household in the CDP was $40,521, and the median income for a family was $47,745. Males had a median income of $38,939 versus $24,830 for females. The per capita income for the CDP was $16,620. About 8.5% of families and 12.0% of the population were below the poverty line, including 16.0% of those under age 18 and 9.9% of those age 65 or over.

Education
The community's public schools are operated by Los Lunas Schools.

References

Census-designated places in Valencia County, New Mexico
Census-designated places in New Mexico
Albuquerque metropolitan area